Eriviat Hall is a historic country house set in a 9 acre estate in Henllan, Denbighshire which was the home of the ffoulkes family and their descendants from the Middle Ages until the early twentieth century. The property is now privately owned by a British Businessman.

History 
Eriviat was associated with the ffoulkes family for more than 10 generations from the Middle Ages. One of the first owners was Ednyfed ap Goronwy Llwyd (fl.1457). His son was Einion Llwyd. Ednyfed’s great-great-grandson was Thomas ap Goronwy (fl.1524–45) whose son, ffoulke ap Thomas ap Goronwy (fl.1539–73), provided the family with its surname of ffoulkes (or Foulkes).

The estate passed through several generations until the death of Robert ffoulkes in 1728. His brother Peter’s fifth son, John ffoulkes (1699–1758), also acquired by marriage the Rhydonen estate in Llantysilio, Denbighshire, through his marriage with Catherine, daughter and heir of Henry Roberts.

Later owners included John ffoulkes (1736–1814), John Powell ffoulkes (1770–1826) and John Jocelyn ffoulkes (1813–58) whose second daughter Edith Caroline married P.H. Humberston of Glan y Wern, Denbighshire. John Proudlock bought the house in 2005. Which was took over by Conrad Proudlock when John passed away. And now is liquidated. It has hosted the actor Kit Harington amongst others.

As of 2021, it was on the market for £1.5m and subsequently sold to a private buyer

Architecture 
The original house may have dated from c.1467. The present house is a brick-built 2-storey house. The entrance elevation has a 3-gable, four-window front, and the remaining windows have mullions and transoms.

References

External links 
 Eriviat Hall: Official Website
 Eriviat Hall: Official Twitter

Country houses in Wales
Houses in Denbighshire